Paul Castro (born March 12, 1975 in Bronx, New York) is an American screenwriter and educator. He's best known for the musical fantasy, August Rush. Former Disney CEO/President Michael Eisner said of Castro, "What clearly resonates with me is Paul's love and dedication to great storytelling. He is a practical artist, yet highly imaginative and talented."

Early life
Castro graduated #1 from UCLA's legendary film school and before that attended military school during his high-school years. He later wrote a script about a nun he met in grade school named Sister Eileen. Castro was a world-class soccer player, earned a full soccer scholarship to college and played in Brazil.

Career
Castro received his master of fine arts from the UCLA School of Theater, Film, and Television in 2000, where he graduated first in his class.  While pursuing his degree, Castro was a finalist for the Coca-Cola Refreshing Filmmaker's Award for directing and producing his original screenplay Healing, and landed a three-picture screenwriting deal worth $1 million.  After graduating from UCLA, Castro became a professional screenwriter in Los Angeles.  His movies have starred Robin Williams, John Travolta, and other A-List movie stars.

August Rush
Castro won and accepted a Movie Guide for being the creator and original writer of August Rush. The romantic musical drama, with music by Mark Mancina, was released November 21, 2007 by Warner Bros. The film is directed by Oscar-nominee Kirsten Sheridan, and stars Freddie Highmore, Keri Russell, Jonathan Rhys Meyers, Terrence Howard and Robin Williams.

August Rush grossed $65.3 million, and received mixed to negative reviews from film critics. In a review by USA Today, Claudia Puig commented, "August Rush will not be for everyone, but it works if you surrender to its lilting and unabashedly sentimental tale of evocative music and visual poetry." The Hollywood Reporter reviewed the film positively, writing "the story is about musicians and how music connects people, so the movie's score and songs, created by composers Mark Mancina and Hans Zimmer, give poetic whimsy to an implausible tale."

Castro signed a deal with Warner Bros. to bring August Rush to Broadway as a stage musical. August Rush premiered on May 3, 2019, at the Paramount Theatre in Aurora, Illinois.  The book was written by Glen Berger, the music was composed by Mark Mancina, and the lyrics were written by both Berger and Mancina.  The play was directed by John Doyle.

Teaching
Following his Hollywood successes, Castro taught screenwriting at UCLA, and created the online course The Million Dollar Screenplay.

Castro created the online screenwriting course, INSPIRATIONAL SCREENWRITING, on udemy.  INSPIRATIONAL SCREENWRITING and his other course THE BUSINESS OF SCREENWRITING has over 12,000 students in 137 different countries.

Castro was a tenured Associate Professor at Elon University.

Personal life 
 For seven years in Los Angeles, Castro volunteered as a suicide prevention counselor. He holds black belts in Tang Soo Do and Jiu-Jitsu.

Military service 
Castro left Hollywood after 9-11 and was commissioned as a Navy officer, where he graduated from officer candidate school.  He was then ordered to Naval Special Warfare Command and became the PAO of the Navy SEAL Teams. There, he participated in the center's Superfrog Triathlon. The Navy SEALs awarded Paul Castro "Honorary Frogman" honors.  After his service, Castro returned to Hollywood.

Filmography

References

External links

1975 births
Living people
UCLA School of Theater, Film and Television faculty
American male screenwriters
Screenwriting instructors
21st-century American male writers
Screenwriters from California
University of Richmond alumni
UCLA Film School alumni
21st-century American screenwriters